The Mattatuxet River is a river in the U.S. state of Rhode Island. It flows approximately 3 km (2 mi). There are two dams along the river's length.

Course
The river rises in North Kingstown from an unnamed pond along Post Road, just east of the RI 138/U.S. 1 interchange. From there, the river flows north to Silver Spring Lake, then south to its mouth at Carr Pond. Below the pond, the river is tidal and becomes the Pettaquamscutt River (Narrow River).

Crossings
Below is a list of all crossings over the Mattatuxet River. The list starts at the headwaters and goes downstream.
North Kingstown
Tower Hill Road (U.S. 1)
Rhode Island State Route 138

Tributaries
The Mattatuxet River has no named tributaries, though it has many unnamed streams that also feed it.

See also
List of rivers in Rhode Island

References
Maps from the United States Geological Survey

Rivers of Washington County, Rhode Island
North Kingstown, Rhode Island
Rivers of Rhode Island